Muşavak (also, Muşavaq and Mushavak) is a village and municipality in the Dashkasan Rayon of Azerbaijan.  It has a population of 362.

References 

Populated places in Dashkasan District